Weezer, also known as the Teal Album or just Teal, is the twelfth studio album by the American rock band Weezer. It was released digitally on January 24, 2019, through Crush Music and Atlantic Records, with a retail release on March 8. The album is composed of cover songs, mostly from the 1980s, making it the band's first covers album. It was announced and released on the same day as a surprise precursor to Weezer's thirteenth studio album, which was released on March 1, 2019. The album received mixed reviews, with some praising the self-aware frivolity of the project, while others criticized the arrangements.

Background
Following the release of Weezer's eleventh album Pacific Daydream, an Internet fan campaign was launched to get Weezer to cover "Africa" by Toto. After initially releasing a cover of "Rosanna", a different Toto song, as a joke, Weezer released their "Africa" cover in May 2018. The cover hit the Billboard Hot 100 and peaked at number one on the Billboard Alternative Songs chart.

Teal was unexpectedly released on January 24, 2019, without prior promotion or advertisement. Several covers on the album have previously been performed live  by both the band and frontman Rivers Cuomo at solo shows.

Cuomo has since described his use of Spotify's data on most played songs to establish the tracklisting for the album.

The album was released digitally on January 24, 2019, with the physical version planned for release on March 8, 2019. To promote the album, Weezer released a teal velcro wallet available for purchase on their website, with the first 100 copies sold including a dollar bill signed by the band members. The velcro wallet sold out quickly, so Weezer released a second promotional bundle on January 24 with a teal Rubik's cube. The band's cover of "No Scrubs" received significant social media attention, with the song trending on Twitter and sparking both sincere and ironic reactions from fans who found the song choice surprising, while TLC member Rozonda "Chilli" Thomas, who sang lead vocal on the original version, openly praised Weezer's rendition, declaring it "AWESOME!!!" on her Twitter account and adding, "It would be even better if we sang it with ya'll!!! I see a TLC/Weezer concert coming up." Weezer themselves responded to Chilli through their own Twitter account by posting the reply, "Hope you want our number", referring to a key line in the song's chorus.

At their 2019 Coachella performance, Weezer brought out TLC's Chilli, as well as English band Tears for Fears for live versions of "No Scrubs" and "Everybody Wants to Rule the World", respectively.

Though not appearing on the official soundtrack, their cover of A-ha's "Take On Me" is featured in the 2020 animated film The SpongeBob Movie: Sponge on the Run.

Critical reception

The Teal Album was met with divided opinions from critics. At the aggregating website Metacritic, the album has received a normalized rating of 58, based on 9 critical reviews, indicating "mixed or average" reviews. In a review of the album for AllMusic, editor Stephen Thomas Erlewine wrote that "Taken on a strictly musical terms, The Teal Album is pretty anodyne stuff. Weezer replicates the arrangements of beloved songs, adds a bit more fuzz on the guitar solos, and flattens the vocal affectations, which amounts to one weird trick: Weezer doesn't attempt to make the songs their own, yet these versions unmistakably sound like Weezer." Matt Beaumont at NME stated "Respectful enough to rouse any struggling family gathering but knowing enough to amuse those in on the joke, 'The Teal Album' at once satirises the covers album and makes a decent stab at perfecting it."

Reviewing the album for Glide Magazine, James Roberts concluded that "The lifelessness of the covers ensures that it has a shelf life that isn’t much longer than your average meme. I suppose given the origins of the album as a Twitter meme it makes sense. Everything about the album—from its conception to its surprise, digital only release—points to the fact that we aren't meant to take it that seriously. But that's kind of the problem, isn't it? Nothing Weezer does can be taken seriously anymore." Nick Flanagan gave the album a grading of 1 out of 5 in the review for Now, claiming that "what's horrible about this record is the total lack of controversy, the lack of anything. It doesn't even pass as a joke album – they're just straight-ahead paint-by-numbers covers, like something a wedding band might play." Tim Sommer wrote that “… there is no reason to listen to The Teal Album. There are no revelations, no hearts are placed on sleeves, no one will be moved, and no one will bother to play one of these tracks in the future”, adding that “… Weezer despise the American music consuming public, and want to prove that today’s consumer will click on literally the most banal and redundant nonsense.”

Michael Roffman was more positive in an assessment for Consequence of Sound, writing "At best, it's a blueprint or rather a teaser for their forthcoming tours, as if to say, "Well, you loved 'Africa', look what else we can do? Come out, folks." Again, that's a more cynical outlook, but hey, maybe Cuomo is being cynical. Maybe this is the self-defeater in him, acknowledging the times, knowing damn well that if he's going to give 'em what they want, he's going to meet them at their level with a shit-eating grin and walk back to the bank."

Commercial performance
The Teal Album peaked at number five in its second week on the Billboard 200, after debuting at number 47 the previous week. This was a significant rebound from Weezer's previous album, Pacific Daydream, which only reached number 23. In its first full tracking week, it debuted with 39,000 album-equivalent units, of which 27,000 were pure album sales.

Track listing

Personnel
Weezer
Rivers Cuomo – lead vocals except "Paranoid", backing vocals on "Paranoid", lead guitar, piano, keyboards, production
Patrick Wilson – drums, percussion, backing vocals, production
Brian Bell – rhythm guitar, backing vocals except "Paranoid", lead vocals on "Paranoid", keyboards, production
Scott Shriner – bass, backing vocals, production

Production
 Mark Rankin – producer, engineer, mixing
 Jason Clark - engineer
 Suzy Shinn – vocal engineer
 Eric Boulanger – mastering

Charts

Weekly charts

Year-end charts

References

External links
 

2019 albums
Weezer albums
Atlantic Records albums
Covers albums
Crush Management albums
Surprise albums
Synth-pop albums by American artists